A potash works (Aschenhütte or Potaschhütte) was a subsidiary operation of a glassworks in the Early Modern Period. The latter needed potash, as well as quartz and lime as raw materials for the manufacture of glass. Potash acted as a flux in the production process, that is by mixing it with quartz sand it significantly reduced the melting point of the latter. To make potash the glassworks built potash huts or works in the vicinity, in which wood ash and vegetable ash was gathered by ash burners and initially washed in water and then vaporized; the whole process being known as leaching.

Contemporary witness, teacher and local historian, Lukas Grünenwald, recorded the recollections from his youth in Dernbach in the Palatinate region:

The consumption of wood in the process of making potash was extremely high, which is why the glassworks were frequently established in areas of extensive forest (hence the term forest glass). For example, the documents of the forest glassworks of Spiegelberg in the Swabian-Franconian Forest, which was in operation from 1705 to 1822, had an annual demand for potash of approximately 800 centners. Because one cubic metre of wood (750 kg) only produced 1 kg of potash, this glassworks thus needed around 40,000 cubic metres of wood per year.

Even today the names of some settlements still recall the former potash works. For example, two hamlets in the municipality of Mainhardt, Germany, are called Aschenhütte.

References

Literature 
 Marianne Hasenmayer: Die Glashütten im Mainhardter Wald und in den Löwensteiner Bergen. In: Paul Strähle (ed.): Naturpark Schwäbisch-Fränkischer Wald. 4th revised and expanded edition. Theiss, Stuttgart, 2006, pp. 108–128 (Natur – Heimat – Wandern).

Glass production
History of glass
Forest history
Potash